In Token Ring networks, A Lobe Attachment Module is a box with multiple interfaces to which new network nodes (known as lobes) can be attached. A LAM may have interfaces up to 20 lobes. Functionally a LAM is like a multi-station access unit (MAU), but with a larger capacity: 20 nodes as opposed to 8 nodes for MAU. The LAM interface may use either IBM connectors or 8P8C (RJ-45) modular plugs. 

LAMs can be daisy chained and connected to a HUB, known as Controlled Access Unit (CAU) in Token Ring terminology. Each CAU can handle up to 4 LAMs for a total of 80 lobes.

Networking hardware